Unplugged is a live album by Canadian / American singer-songwriter Neil Young, released on June 15, 1993, on Reprise. Recorded on February 7, 1993, the album is an installment of the MTV series, Unplugged. The performance was also released on VHS.

Background and recording
The recording of Unplugged was reportedly rife with tension, with Young displeased with the performances of many of his band members. The released version was his second attempt at recording a set suitable for airing and release.

The track "Stringman" was recorded for Young's notoriously unreleased studio album Chrome Dreams.

Track listing
All tracks composed by Neil Young
 "The Old Laughing Lady"  – 5:15
 "Mr. Soul"  – 3:54
 "World on a String"  – 3:02
 "Pocahontas"  – 5:06
 "Stringman" (previously unreleased) – 4:01
 "Like a Hurricane"  – 4:44
 "The Needle and the Damage Done"  – 2:52
 "Helpless"  – 5:48
 "Harvest Moon"  – 5:20
 "Transformer Man"  – 3:36
 "Unknown Legend"  – 4:47
 "Look Out for My Love"  – 5:57
 "Long May You Run"  – 5:22
 "From Hank to Hendrix"  – 5:51

In addition to the tracks found on this album, Neil Young performed the following songs live during the performance:

"Dreamin' Man"
"Sample and Hold"
"War of Man"
"Winterlong"

Personnel

Neil Young - guitar, harmonica, piano, pump organ, lead vocals
Nils Lofgren - guitar, autoharp, accordion, backing vocals
Ben Keith - Dobro
Spooner Oldham - piano, pump organ
Tim Drummond - bass
Oscar Butterworth - drums
Astrid Young - backing vocals
Nicolette Larson - backing vocals
Larry Cragg - broom on "Harvest Moon"

Charts

Certifications and sales

References

Unplugged (Young, Neil album)
Albums produced by David Briggs (producer)
Neil Young live albums
1993 live albums
Reprise Records live albums